Rhode Island Stingrays was an American soccer team based in Providence, Rhode Island, United States. Founded in 1995, the team played in the USL Premier Development League (PDL), the fourth tier of the American Soccer Pyramid, until 2009, after which the franchise folded and the team left the league.

The team played its home games at Robert J. Black Stadium on the campus of Rhode Island College. The team's colors were blue, white and yellow.

History

Year-by-year

Honors
 USISL D-3 Pro League Northeast Division Champion 1998

Head coaches
  Mario Pereira (2003–2009)

Stadia
 Pierce Memorial Field; East Providence, Rhode Island (2003–2008)
 Stadium at Kickemuit middle school; Warren, Rhode Island, 1 game (2005)
 Robert J. Black Stadium; Providence, Rhode Island, (2006, 2009)
 Stadium at Bryant University; Smithfield, Rhode Island, 1 game (2007)

Average attendance
Attendance stats are calculated by averaging each team's self-reported home attendances from the historical match archive at https://web.archive.org/web/20100105175057/http://www.uslsoccer.com/history/index_E.html.

 2005: 332
 2006: 310
 2007: 305
 2008: not yet available
 2009: 167

References

External links
Official Website

Association football clubs established in 1995
Association football clubs disestablished in 2009
Defunct Premier Development League teams
Soccer clubs in Rhode Island
USL Second Division teams
USISL teams
1995 establishments in Rhode Island
2009 disestablishments in Rhode Island